Marcelle Duc (22 March 1917 – 23 November 2014), known professionally as Hélène Duc, was a French actress. She appeared in Edward and Caroline (1951), Je sais rien, mais je dirai tout (1973), and Tanguy (2001).

Duc played the role of Mahaut, Countess of Artois in the 1972 miniseries Les Rois maudits, and later played Marguerite de Bouville in the 2005 adaptation of the same novels.

In 1983, she performed at the Théâtre de la Gaîté-Montparnasse in a production of Chienne Dactylographe. She was named an officer of the Legion of Honour and Righteous Among the Nations in 2005.

Duc was married to René Catroux, with whom she had two daughters.

Partial filmography 

1945: Paris Frills as Une employée de la maison de couture (uncredited)
1951: Edward and Caroline as L'invitée mélomane
1952: Le plus heureux des hommes as L'avocate mondaine
1955: The Grand Maneuver as La préfète (uncredited)
1959: Picnic on the Grass as Isabelle
1960: Le caïd as Edmée
1962: How to Succeed in Love as La femme du directeur des Editions du Soleil
1964: Male Hunt as Madame Armande
1965: Les baratineurs as Marie-Louise du Portail
1966: Les malabars sont au parfum as Tante Berthe
1968: À tout casser as La bourgeoise
1972-1973: Les Rois maudits (TV Mini-Series) as Mahaut, Countess of Artois
1973: La femme en bleu
1973: Je sais rien, mais je dirai tout as Mme Gastié-Leroy
1975: Le faux-cul as Mamy
1975: Catherine & Co.
1982: Toutes griffes dehors (TV Mini-Series, directed by Michel Boisrond)
1987: Miss Mona as The Mother
1987: Promis... juré! as Bonne Maman
1997: Les Soeurs Soleil as La dame chez le vétérinaire
2001: Un ange as Natacha
2001: Tanguy as Odile Guetz
2003: Laisse tes mains sur mes hanches (directed by Chantal Lauby) as Mme Tatin
2005: Les Rois maudits (TV Mini-Series) as Marguerite de Bouville
2007: Souffrance as Annie (final film role)

References

External links

 
 
 
 
 
 
 
 
 Hélène Duc – her activity to save Jews' lives during the Holocaust, at Yad Vashem website

1917 births
2014 deaths
French film actresses
Officiers of the Légion d'honneur
People from Bergerac, Dordogne
French Righteous Among the Nations
Burials at Père Lachaise Cemetery
20th-century French women